The PV Pyap is a tourist paddle vessel operating within Swan Hill's Pioneer Settlement. Originally launched as a barge in July 1896 at Mannum, the Pyap was completed as a paddle steamer in late 1897 and operated on the Murray River. In 1970, the Pyap was purchased by Toby Henson and refitted with a diesel enginge, with the intention of relocation to the Pioneer Settlement.

History

Construction and early history
The Pyap was first launched, built as a barge by Mesers. W Westergarde and Sons, at the Mannum Dry Dock on Saturday 18 July 1896. She was constructed with the intention that "should the trade warrant it she [could] at any time be easily converted into a steamer by the addition of the necessary machinery". By early October 1897 the Pyap had been completed as a paddle steamer, now fitted with a 10-horsepower Marshall & Sons 2-cylinder geared steam engine. She was recorded at this time as being "the lightest draught river steamer afloat on the Murray". She was also advertised as featuring four cabins, a general store on deck, a dining saloon, and "two nice comfortable sleeping berths on the hurricane deck". She left Milang for her maiden voyage on Tuesday 21 September, 1897. She was recorded in mid-October as having collected several loads of wool from Wellington Lodge, Nalpa, and Sir W Jervois' stations.

Life as a hawking steamer
On Saturday 30 September 1899, the PS Pyap saw incident when the son of J Bails, aged 10 years, fell overboard while the vessel was traveling at a rate of five miles per hour. Son of C Wallace, Hubert Wallace, jumped in and bought the victim to safety. In June 1901, it was reported that the Pyap "ran against sandbanks several times before reaching Morgan". On August 20, 1908, the vessel met trouble when three miles from her departure location of Murray Bridge a driving gear broke, rendering her machinery useless. With Captain W Sladden at the helm, a line was fixed to a small gum tree on the adjoining swamp. Due to the strain of the vessel and the wind, the tree was unearthed by its roots, with the paddle steamer continuing at the mercy of the current and wind. Fortunately, a large fallen gum tree arrested the vessel's course, and the only resulting damage was a broken paddle box. The Pyap was steaming again within 12 hours.

It was reported by The Mount Barker Courier and Onkaparinga and Gumeracha Advertiser in 1909 that while under the ownership of Eudunda Co-operative Company, the original steam engine of the PS Pyap was removed and sold under the recommendation of Capt. Oliver. This was replaced with the original enginge from the PS Victor; an 1892 Garrett and Sons 16 horsepower 2-cylinder compound semi-portable steam engine that consumed 10 to 12 tons of wood a day (while steaming an average of 16 hours a day at 8 miles an hour). In the first 18 months that the Eudunda Co-operative Company owned the Pyap, they spent over £700 on altercations and improvements. She was reported at this time as being a hawking steamer, carrying over £2000 worth of fresh produce, groceries, and the latest fashion. During the 1940s, the Pyap was owned and operated by Captain William Grimwood 'Pop' Collins and his wife Amy Collins.

Relocation to the Pioneer Settlement
The PS Pyap was brought to the Pioneer Settlement in Swan Hill in 1970 to be converted to a tourist vessel. Prior to arrival, the Pyap was fitted with a 225 hp GM671 Gray Marine diesel engine, replacing her steam engine (and rendering her a paddle vessel). The vessel sank shortly after arrival, as cracks in her hull had allowed water to seep into the bilge over time. The original timber in the composite hull was replaced with steel, and she resumed operation in 1971. In February 1977, the Pyap became stranded in mud on the Murray River near Swan Hill when the river level dropped to below 30 cm. Despite efforts made by Captain Ed Hazelman to cut a channel in the mud with a home-made dredge, she remained stranded until a downpour of rain in April 1977 raised the river level sufficiently to refloat the vessel. Following this ordeal, the Pyap returned to working back and forth the 13 km of river between Swan Hill and the Murray Downs station. During 1978, the Pyap was boarded by Charles, Prince of Wales. Shortly after, on 27 September 1978, the Pyap caught fire and burnt to the waterline of the vessel. The entire superstructure was replaced over a period of 6 weeks. On October 18, 1987, a paddle steamer race was planned in Echuca between the PS Pyap and the PS Canberra for the Rich River Festival, however the race was cancelled before the event took place.

The PS  Pyap currently operates daily cruises on the Little Murray River (also known as the Marrabor River) at the Pioneer Settlement in Swan Hill.

Steam engine
The 1892 Garrett and Sons 16 horsepower compound steam engine of the PS Pyap was restored and temporarily re-used on the PV Mundoo when constructed in 1987. Following the purchase of the PS Mundoo on December 5, 1999, she steamed 888 km upstream from Goolwa to Mildura. Due to the faster river nature in Mildura, the original 1892 steam engine from the PS Pyap was removed from the Mundoo and replaced with a Cummins Diesel Hydraulic engine, rendering her a paddle vessel.

References

Paddle steamers of Australia
1897 ships